Wrigley's Spearmint is a brand of Wrigley's chewing gum. Wrigley's launched the brand in 1893, and markets the gum as its classic brand, although the company's brand Juicy Fruit has been on the market slightly longer. As the name implies, the gum is flavored with the spearmint plant.

Gum was originally marketed by being given away free with the purchase of baking soda. It became so popular that it was then eventually sold separately as a desired commodity. 

In 2004, it was relaunched in the United States and United Kingdom, with the slogan "even better, longer lasting". Another advertising campaign was "some call it a spear, some call it an arrow." The spear/arrow has been a constant in the brand's advertising, as has been the mint leaf motif.

The gum was traditionally grey/beige in color, almost the same color as Juicy Fruit and Doublemint.

References

External links 
 

Products introduced in 1893
Chewing gum
Wrigley Company brands